The 2018 Currie Cup Premier Division was the top tier of the 2018 Currie Cup, the 80th edition of the annual South African rugby union competition organised by the South African Rugby Union. It was played between 17 August and 27 October 2018 and featured the same seven teams as in 2017.

Competition rules and information

There were seven participating teams in the 2018 Currie Cup Premier Division. They played each other once during the pool stage, either at home or away. Teams received four points for a win and two points for a draw. Bonus points were awarded to teams that scored four or more tries in a game, as well as to teams that lost a match by seven points or less. Teams were ranked by log points, then points difference (points scored less points conceded).

The top four teams in the pool stage qualified for the semifinals, which were followed by a final.

Teams

The teams that played in the 2018 Currie Cup Premier Division are:

Pool stage

Standings
The final log for the 2018 Currie Cup Premier Division was:

Round-by-round

The table below shows a team's progression throughout the season. For each round, each team's cumulative points total is shown with the overall log position in brackets.

Matches

The following matches were played in the 2018 Currie Cup Premier Division:

Round One

The  won the match 42–19, with fly-half Chris Smith having a Currie Cup debut to remember, scoring 22 points in his side's victory. In the other match, the  beat the  34–12 in Bloemfontein, with their fly-half Manie Libbok scoring 17 points, including his team's opening try.

Round Two

The three teams that has byes in Round One all secured home victories in Round Two. Winger Courtnall Skosan scored a hat-trick and Hacjivah Dayimani got a brace as the Golden Lions ran in nine tries, with fly-half Shaun Reynolds kicking 17 points. Griquas fly-half George Whitehead scored 16 points for the losing team, who scored five tries of their own.

Round Three

Western Province remain top on points differential after a 57–28 victory over the Pumas, with Sergeal Petersen scoring two of his side's eight tries, and winger SP Marais contributing 22 points through one try, seven conversions and a penalty.

Round Four

The  and the  both maintained their perfect record, making it three bonus point wins out of three. Two tries from Griquas centre André Swarts was not enough as the side from Pretoria scored seven tries to secure the win. A bye weekend saw  drop from first to fourth on the log.

Round Five

The side from Cape Town secured a 65–38 win, scoring nine tries in the process with Dillyn Leyds and Sergeal Petersen scoring two each, while SP Marais contributed 25 of his side's points through one try, seven conversions and two penalties. The result saw Western Province move up to third on the log, one place behind the Golden Lions. In the weekend's other match, 17 points from George Whitehead and two tries from lock FP Pelser saw  move up to fifth spot by beating the  52–24, a result which confirmed that the team from Bloemfontein won't take part in the semifinals.

Round Six

The  and  both maintained their perfect starts to the season, each winning their fourth consecutive match ahead of their meeting in Round Seven. Loose-forward Dan du Preez also scored a brace, for the Sharks in their 37–21 victory over a  side that lost their second match in a row, with Sharks fly-half Robert du Preez scoring 17 points with the boot. In the other match of the weekend, Ryan Nell scored two tries as the  picked up their second win of the season, beating the  42–14 to condemn the team from Bloemfontein to a winless season, having lost all six of their matches. The Sharks and Western Province mathematically assured their semifinal berths, while the Blue Bulls, Golden Lions and Pumas remained in the race for the other two spots.

Round Seven

The home side won the match 50–28 with SP Marais contributing 20 of his side's points, securing a home semi-final in the process.

Round Eight

Round Eight saw a full round of three matches being played, with the first of these finalising the semifinal lineup; the  beat the  33–21 in Mbombela — with both Corné Fourie and Courtnall Skosan scoring a brace of tries — to end the latter's involvement in the competition and ensuring the Golden Lions and the  advanced to the knockout stage. The  clinched a home semifinal by easily beating  in Kimberley, with wingers Lwazi Mvovo and Leolin Zas each scoring two tries in a 41–11 win. Western Province were leading 34–7, and this was declared the final result of the match following the abandonment.

Play-offs

Title play-offs

Semifinals

The semifinal matches went according to form, with the top two teams from the pool stage and home semifinalists  and  both winning. Western Province and the  met for the second week in a row, but unlike the Round Eight match that saw Western Province win in a 40-minute match, this encounter finished 32–all during normal time, with the Blue Bulls' Dylan Sage scoring a try after the final hooter to level the scores and send the match into extra time. Western Province recovered and retained their lead to win 35–32 after extra time, thanks to a penalty from SP Marais, who scored 30 of his side's points in the victory.

Final

The  won their first title since 2013 after beating  17–12 in Cape Town. The only points in the first half came from the boot of Western Province kicker SP Marais, who slotted penalties in the 19th and 35th minutes to secure a 6–0 half-time lead for the home side. A try for Sharks hooker Akker van der Merwe, converted by fly-half Robert du Preez, saw the Sharks take a 7–6 lead shortly after the interval. A Marais penalty in the 49th minute restored Western Province's lead, but Du Preez responded in kind two minutes later to restore the Sharks' lead. The decisive score came in the 70th minute, when Sharks flank Tyler Paul scored a try — again converted by Du Preez — to make the scoreline 17–9. A penalty from Damian Willemse wasn't enough for the home side, and the Sharks secured the eighth Currie Cup title in their history.

Relegation play-off

  remained in the Currie Cup Premier Division for 2019.
  remained in the Currie Cup First Division for 2019.

Honours

The honour roll for the 2018 Currie Cup Premier Division was as follows:

Players

The squads and player appearance and scoring statistics for the 2018 Currie Cup Premier Division are as follows:

Referees

The following referees officiated matches in the 2018 Currie Cup Premier Division:

See also

 2018 Currie Cup First Division
 2018 Rugby Challenge

References

External links
 SARU website

2018 Currie Cup
2018
2018 in South African rugby union
2018 rugby union tournaments for clubs